Martella is a genus of ant mimicking jumping spiders that was first described by George and Elizabeth Peckham in 1892.

Species
 it contains twelve species, found in Central America, Peru, Argentina, Brazil, and Mexico:
Martella amapa Galiano, 1996 – Brazil
Martella bicavata (Chickering, 1946) – Panama
Martella camba (Galiano, 1969) – Argentina
Martella furva (Chickering, 1946) – Panama
Martella gandu Galiano, 1996 – Brazil
Martella goianensis Galiano, 1969 – Brazil
Martella lineatipes F. O. Pickard-Cambridge, 1900 – Mexico to Costa Rica
Martella maria Peckham & Peckham, 1892 – Brazil
Martella mutillaeformis (Taczanowski, 1878) – Peru
Martella pasteuri Galiano, 1996 – Brazil
Martella pottsi Peckham & Peckham, 1892 (type) – Guatemala to Brazil
Martella utingae (Galiano, 1967) – Brazil

References

Salticidae genera
Salticidae
Spiders of Central America
Spiders of Mexico
Spiders of South America